The Malay language has many loanwords from Sanskrit, Persian, Tamil, Greek, Latin, Portuguese, Dutch, certain Chinese dialects and more recently, Arabic (in particular many religious terms) and English (in particular many scientific and technological terms). Modern Malay loanwords are now primarily from English, Arabic and Javanese — English being the language of trade and technology while Arabic is the language of religion (Islam in the case of this language's concentrated regions), although key words such as surga/ syurga (heaven) and the word "religion" itself (agama) reflect their Sanskrit-Hindu origins. Javanese elements on the other hand are incorporated from the variant of Malay used in Indonesia through the consumption of media from said country.

While based on Malay itself, Indonesian is traditionally more influenced by Javanese and Sundanese, as the Javanese are the largest ethnic group in Indonesia, with Javanese having the largest number of native speakers. Dutch influence over Indonesian vocabulary also is significant, as the Malay language itself was favored and adopted due to its trading benefit during VOC era over the archipelago, leading to mass loanword and influence over the modern Indonesian language. It is known that at least one third of the Indonesian vocabulary grew under Dutch influence.

There are some words in Malay which are spelled exactly the same as in its other language counterparts, e.g. in English – museum (Indonesian), hospital (Malaysian), format, lesbian, transit etc. In contrast, some Malay words have been loaned into other languages, e.g. in English – rice paddy ("Padi"), orangutan, rattan, babirusa, cockatoo, compound, gong, tuak, sago, cootie, amok, durian, agar, rambutan, keris, Pantoum/pantun, "so long", angrecum (anggrek/ anggrik), cassowary, gingham, caddie, camphor (kapur), Gutta-percha (getah perca), launch, parang, sarong, dammar, gambir.

The Malay language has also heavily influenced the forms of colloquial English spoken in Malaysia, also known as Manglish.

Some examples as follows:

See also
 List of English words of Malay origin
 List of loanwords in Indonesian
List of words of Malay origin at Wiktionary

References

Further reading
 Loan Words in Indonesian and Malay languages - Professor J.G. de Casparis
 Loan Words in Indonesian and Malay — University of Washington Press. 

Malay language
Malay words and phrases
Malay
Malaysia-related lists